Ushi Island (Russian: Остров Уши) is an islet in the Eugénie Archipelago within the Peter the Great Gulf of the Sea of Japan. It is administratively part of the city of Vladivostok in Primorsky Krai, Russia. It is almost devoid of vegetation, and consists of two rocks which connected narrow and low isthmus. There are shoals  near the island. It is a popular spot for fish and birds alike. Owing to its size however, only a limited number of birds can roost on the island.

References 

Islands of the Russian Far East
Islands of the Sea of Japan
Uninhabited islands of Russia
Islands of Vladivostok
Islands of Primorsky Krai